William Rodolphus Christopher (March 4, 1924 – December 5, 1973) was an American artist and civil rights activist known for his abstract imagery and collage. Christopher taught at Dartmouth College and served as a representative of the Dartmouth chapter of the NAACP. He participated in the March 13–15, 1965 civil rights demonstrations marching from Selma to Montgomery, Alabama. HIs painting Dark Mirror was chosen by Martin Luther King, Jr. to hang in his office at the Southern Christian Leadership Conference (SCLC) in Atlanta. His longtime partner was the artist George Tooker; the pair lived in New York City until 1960, when they moved to Hartland, Vermont; the couple spent winters in Spain, where Christopher died in December 1973. His papers are held at the Archives of American Art.

References

External links
William Christopher on ArtNet

1924 births
1973 deaths
American LGBT artists
American civil rights activists
Dartmouth College faculty
20th-century American male artists
20th-century American LGBT people